Regulation of UAVs in the United Kingdom prescribes the rules that operators of unmanned aerial vehicles must follow in the UK.

History 
In August 2012, The UK's Civil Aviation Authority (CAA) stated that it would require non-military drones larger than 20 kg to be able to automatically sense other aircraft and steer to avoid them.

As of 2013, the CAA requires that UAV aircraft less than 20 kilograms in weight must be in direct visual contact with the pilot, cannot fly within 150 meters of a congested area or within 50 meters of a person or vehicle, and cannot be used for commercial activity.

In July 2018, the CAA forbade flying above  and flying within  of an airport or airfield boundary.

Between 19 and 21 December 2018, flights were canceled at Gatwick Airport following reports of drone sightings close to the runway.

Regulation 
The Civil Aviation Authority created a "Drone code" which lists the following regulations, forming the acronym DRONE:

Further:

 Follow the manufacturer's instructions.

On 20 February 2019, the Department for Transport announced legislation to extend the ‘no-fly’ zone around airports, banning drones from flying within 5 kilometers (3.1 mi) of runways.

Operators of drones and model aircraft must obtain an 'Operator' ID and 'Flyer ID' from the Civil Aviation Authority before using their drone, which are awarded together after passing an online theory test. Children under the age of 18 cannot obtain an Operator ID, though they can be registered as flyers of their parent or legal guardian's drone by passing the same theory test and receiving a Flyer ID. After passing the theory test, all drones must display the owner's Operator ID when in operation. Flyer IDs must be renewed every three years, while Operator IDs must be renewed annually.

References

External links
 UK CAA Regulations and Overview
 Drone Safe

Unmanned aerial vehicles of the United Kingdom
Aviation law
Regulation of unmanned aerial vehicles
Regulation in the United Kingdom